Egypt first participated at the Olympic Games in 1912, and has sent athletes to compete in most editions of the Summer Olympic since then. Along with Cambodia, Iraq and Lebanon, Egypt boycotted the 1956 Summer Olympics in protest of the tripartite Israeli, British, and French invasion of Egypt in the Suez War. However, the equestrian events for the 1956 Games were held in Stockholm, Sweden five months earlier (because of Australian quarantine regulations), and three Egyptian riders competed there.  Egypt withdrew from the 1976 Summer Olympics after three days of competition to join the broad African boycott in response to the participation of New Zealand, who still had sporting links with apartheid South Africa.  Egypt also participated in the American-led boycott of the 1980 Summer Olympics.  Egypt's lone participation at the Winter Olympic Games was a single alpine skier in 1984.

Egyptian athletes have won a total of 38 medals, with weightlifting as the top medal-producing sport.

The National Olympic Committee for Egypt is the Egyptian Olympic Committee, and was created in 1910.

Medal tables

Medals by Summer Games

Medals by Winter Games

Medals by Summer Sport

List of medalists

Flagbearers

See also
 List of flag bearers for Egypt at the Olympics
 List of Olympic women for Egypt
 :Category:Olympic competitors for Egypt
 Egypt at the Paralympics

References

External links